Lu Yen-hsun was the defending champion but decided not to participate.
Dmitry Tursunov and Matthias Bachinger reached the final in which Bachinger claimed the title, because Tursunov withdrew due to a knee problem.

Seeds

Draw

Finals

Top half

Bottom half

References
 Main Draw
 Qualifying Draw

Status Athens Open - Singles
2011 Singles